Watonwan may refer to:

 Watonwan County, Minnesota
 Watonwan River, in Minnesota
 USS Watonwan (ID-4296), a United States Navy cargo ship in commission in 1919